is the eighth single by Bump of Chicken. The title track was on the album . It is their first number one single on Oricon Weekly Charts.

Track listing
All tracks written by Fujiwara Motoo.

 (Hidden track)

Personnel
Fujiwara Motoo — Guitar, vocals
Masukawa Hiroaki — Guitar
Naoi Yoshifumi — Bass
Masu Hideo — Drums

Chart performance

References

External links
オンリー ロンリー グローリー on the official Bump of Chicken website.

2004 singles
Bump of Chicken songs
Oricon Weekly number-one singles
2004 songs
Toy's Factory singles